Deadly Secret, also known as Lin Sing Kuet is a Hong Kong wuxia television series adapted from Louis Cha's novel A Deadly Secret. The series was first broadcast on TVB in Hong Kong in 1989.

Cast

 Note: Some of the characters' names are in Cantonese romanisation.

 Roger Kwok as Tik Wan
 Kitty Lai as Chik Fong
 Shallin Tse as Shui Sang
 Francis Ng as Man Kwai
 Andy Tai as Wong Siu-fung
 Kenneth Tsang as Ting Tin
 Maggie Chan as Ling Sheung-wah
 Kwan Hoi-san as Ling Tui-see
 Kwan Ching as Chik Cheung-fat
 Yip Tin-hang as Yin Tat-ping
 Choi Wan as Man Chun-san
 Jim Ping-hei as Ng Ham
 Newton Lai as Shui Toi
 Kwok Fung as Fa Tit-kon
 So Hon-sang as Lau Sing-fung
 Ma Hing-sang as Luk Tin-shu
 Chu Tit-wo as Huet-do Lo-tso
 Lee Hoi-sang as Po-cheung
 Eddy Ko as Mui Nim-sang
 Mak Tin-yan as Taoist Muk
 Cheng Yin-fung as Kuk Yau
 Chan On-ying as Tsui-lin
 Sheung-koon Yuk as Mrs Ling
 Wilson Tsui as Ah-chung
 Chan Tik-hak as Yu Chin-lei
 Chan Yau-hau as Huet-do Lo-mo

See also
A Deadly Secret
Lian Cheng Jue

External links

1989 Hong Kong television series debuts
1989 Hong Kong television series endings
TVB dramas
Works based on A Deadly Secret
Hong Kong wuxia television series
Hong Kong action television series
Martial arts television series
Television series set in Imperial China
1980s Hong Kong television series
Cantonese-language television shows
Television shows based on works by Jin Yong